Coralie Chacon (born 12 May 1985) is a French former artistic gymnast. She competed at the 2004 Summer Olympics.

References

1985 births
Living people
French female artistic gymnasts
Gymnasts at the 2004 Summer Olympics
Olympic gymnasts of France
Sportspeople from Nîmes
21st-century French women